Luis Vicente Bernetti (24 March 1934 – 11 August 2017) was a Catholic bishop.

Ordained to the priesthood in 1958, Bernetti served as auxiliary bishop of the Catholic Diocese of Palmas-Francisco Belrão, Brazil, from 1996 to 2005. He then served as bishop of the Roman Catholic Diocese of Apucarana, Brazil, from 2005 to 2009.

Notes

1934 births
2017 deaths
21st-century Roman Catholic bishops in Brazil
20th-century Roman Catholic bishops in Brazil
Roman Catholic bishops of Apucarana
Roman Catholic bishops of Palmas–Francisco Beltrão